

FormatFactory is an ad-supported freeware multimedia converter that can convert video, audio, and picture files. It is also capable of ripping DVDs and CDs to other file formats, as well as creating .iso images. It can also join multiple video files together into one. FormatFactory supports the following formats:

Criticism 

On June 22, 2009, Format Factory was hanged on the FFmpeg's hall of shame.

An issue tracker post claims that Format Factory violates the FFmpeg license.

See also 
 Comparison of video converters
 Comparison of DVD ripper software
 List of audio conversion software
 List of video editing software

References

External links 
 

Audio format converters
Graphics software
Video conversion software
Multimedia software
Windows-only freeware